is a Japanese former football player.

Playing career
Funatsu was born in Kagoshima on November 22, 1983. After graduating from high school, he joined J1 League club Júbilo Iwata with teammate Yuya Hikichi in 2002. However he could not play at all in the match. In 2003, he moved to J2 League club Shonan Bellmare. However he could not play at all in the match. In 2005, he moved to Regional Leagues club Rosso Kumamoto. However he left the club in April. In 2006, he moved to Regional Leagues club New Wave Kitakyushu (later Giravanz Kitakyushu). The club was relegated to Japan Football League (JFL) from 2008 and J2 League from 2010. However he could hardly play in the match for the club. In 2011, he moved to Regional Leagues club Hoyo AC Elan Oita. He played many matches and was promoted to JFL end of 2011 season. He retired end of 2011 season.

Club statistics

References

External links

1983 births
Living people
Association football people from Kagoshima Prefecture
Japanese footballers
J1 League players
J2 League players
Japan Football League players
Júbilo Iwata players
Shonan Bellmare players
Roasso Kumamoto players
Giravanz Kitakyushu players
Verspah Oita players
Association football goalkeepers
People from Kagoshima